Khisamutdinov, female form Khisamutdinova, is a Russian surname.

Notable people with this surname include:
 Arsen Khisamutdinov (born 1998), Russian ice hockey player
 Shamil Khisamutdinov (born 1950), Russian wrestler